Justin Lower (born April 4, 1989) is an American professional golfer.

Amateur career
Lower competed for Malone University in college. He was the 2010 NAIA champion.

Professional career
Lower began playing on the Web.com Tour (now Korn Ferry Tour) in 2014.

Lower won the Ohio Open in 2012 and 2015.

He won the pro-am division of the 2021 Korn Ferry BMW Charity Pro-Am with playing partner Doug Walker. 

In 2021, he secured his PGA Tour card for the 2021–22 season on the last hole of the Korn Ferry Tour Championship.

Amateur wins
2010 NAIA Men's Golf Championship

Professional wins (2)
2012 Ohio Open
2015 Ohio Open

Playoff record
Korn Fery Tour playoff record (0–1)

Results in The Players Championship

CUT = missed the halfway cut

See also
2021 Korn Ferry Tour Finals graduates

References

External links

American male golfers
PGA Tour golfers
Korn Ferry Tour graduates
Golfers from Ohio
College men's golfers in the United States
Malone Pioneers
Sportspeople from Akron, Ohio
People from Stark County, Ohio
1989 births
Living people